This list of Oregon Ballet Theatre performers comprises dancers who have performed as members of the Oregon Ballet Theatre (OBT); the years in parentheses indicate when the dancers joined OBT.

2011-2012 season
As of February 2012, the dance company includes:

Principal dancers

 Brett Bauer (2010-) 
 Xuan Cheng (2011-) 
 Chauncey Parsons (2008-) 
 Alison Roper (1996-2014) 
 Haiyan Wu (2011-) 
 Yang Zou (2011-)

Soloists

 Candace Bouchard (2003-)
 Ansa Deguchi (2003-) 

 Ye Li (2011-) 
 Julia Rowe (2011-) 
 Brian Simcoe (2005-) 
 Lucas Threefoot (2006-) 
 Javier Ubell(2007-)

Company artists

 Eva Burton (2010-) 
 Martina Chavez (2007-) 
 Ashley Dawn (2010-) 
 Adam Hartley (2011-) 
 Makino Hayashi (2010-) 
 Olga Krochik (2006-) 
 Michael Linsmeier (2011-) 
 Kate Oderkirk (2011-) 
 Olivia Ornelas (2011-) 
 Grace Shibley (2006-)

Former dancers

Former dancers with the Oregon Ballet Theatre include:

Former principal dancers

 Gavin Larsen (2003-2010) 
 Yuka Iino (2003-2013) 
 Kathi Martuza (2003-2012) 
Anne Mueller (1996-2011), [Interim Artistic Director (2013-)] 
 Artur Sultanov (2003-2012) 
 Ronnie Underwood (2005-2010)

Former soloists

 Brennan Boyer (2005-2011) 
 Adrian Fry (2006-2010) 
 Steven Houser (2004-2011)

Former company artists

 Scott Bebell (2010-2011) 
 Leta Biasucci (2008-2011) 
 Michael Breeden (2011-2012) 
 Andrea Cooper (2006-2011) 
 Christopher Costantini (2012-2014)
 Mia Leimkuhler (2003-2011) 
 Neil Marshall (2011-2012) 
 Matthew Pippin (2007-2010) 
 Christian Squires (2008-2011) 
 Brent Slack-Wolfe (2010-2012) 
 Raychel Weiner (2008-2010)

References

External links
 

Ore
Ballet-related lists
Oregon Ballet Theatre